Chop suey  is a dish in American Chinese cuisine and other forms of overseas Chinese cuisine, consisting of meat (usually chicken, pork, beef, shrimp or fish) and eggs, cooked quickly with vegetables such as bean sprouts, cabbage, and celery and bound in a starch-thickened sauce. It is typically served with rice but can become the Chinese-American form of chow mein with the substitution of stir-fried noodles for rice.

Chop suey has become a prominent part of American Chinese cuisine, Filipino cuisine, Canadian Chinese cuisine, German Chinese cuisine, Indian Chinese cuisine, and Polynesian cuisine. In Chinese Indonesian cuisine/Dutch Chinese Indonesian cuisine it is known as cap cai (tjap tjoi) (雜菜, "mixed vegetables") and mainly consists of vegetables.

Origins
Chop suey is widely believed to have been developed in the U.S. by Chinese Americans, but the anthropologist E. N. Anderson, a scholar of Chinese food,  traces the dish to tsap seui (杂碎, "miscellaneous leftovers"), common in Taishan (Toisan), a county in Guangdong province, the home of many early Chinese immigrants to the United States. Hong Kong doctor Li Shu-fan likewise reported that he knew it in Toisan in the 1890s.

The long list of conflicting stories about the origin of chop suey is, in the words of food historian Alan Davidson, "a prime example of culinary mythology" and typical of popular foods.

One account claims that it was invented by Chinese American cooks working on the transcontinental railroad in the 19th century. Another tale is that it was created during Qing Dynasty premier Li Hongzhang's visit to the United States in 1896 by his chef, who tried to create a meal suitable for both Chinese and American palates. Another story is that Li wandered to a local Chinese restaurant after the hotel kitchen had closed, where the chef, embarrassed that he had nothing ready to offer, came up with the new dish using scraps of leftovers. Yet recent research by the scholar Renqui Yu led him to conclude that "no evidence can be found in available historical records to support the story that Li Hung Chang ate chop suey in the United States." Li brought three Chinese chefs with him, and would not have needed to eat in local restaurants or invent new dishes in any case. Yu speculates that shrewd Chinese American restaurant owners took advantage of the publicity surrounding his visit to promote chop suey as Li's favorite.

Another myth is that, in the 1860s, a Chinese restaurant cook in San Francisco was forced to serve something to drunken miners after hours, when he had no fresh food. To avoid a beating, the cook threw leftover meat and vegetables into a wok and served it to the miners, who loved it and asked what dish it was—he replied "chopped sui". There is no good evidence for any of these stories.

Chop suey appears in an 1884 article in the Brooklyn Eagle, by Wong Chin Foo, "Chinese Cooking", which he says "may justly be so-called the 'national dish of China'." An 1888 description states it was a "staple dish for the Chinese gourmand is chow chop svey , a mixture of chickens' livers and gizzards, fungi, bamboo buds, pigs' tripe, and bean sprouts stewed with spices." An 1896 newspaper report states: "Chow chop suey is a sort of stew made of chicken's livers and gizzards, calves' tripe, bean sprouts, celery and 'meu', which is a sort of Chinese first cousin to macaroni". An article in The Illustrated American on Chinese cuisine in 1897, reproduces a menu from Ma Hung Low's restaurant on Mott Street in New York's Chinatown quarter which includes the dish "Beef Chop Suey with Bean Sprouts, Water Chestnuts and Boiled Rice." The dish itself, referred to as "the standard Chinese dish of chop suey," is described as "a stew of beef, chicken, or pork, with bean sprouts, mushrooms, water-lily roots, sprouted grain and unknown flavorings." In 1898, it is described as "A Hash of Pork, with Celery, Onions, Bean Sprouts, etc."

During his travels in the United States, Liang Qichao, a Guangdong (Canton) native, wrote in 1903 that there existed in the United States a food item called chop suey which was popularly served by Chinese restaurateurs, but which local Chinese people do not eat, because the cooking technique is "really awful".

In earlier periods of Chinese history, chop suey or chap sui in Cantonese, and za sui, in Mandarin, has the different meaning of cooked animal offal or entrails. For example, in the classic novel Journey to the West (circa 1590), Sun Wukong tells a lion-monster in chapter 75: "When I passed through Guangzhou, I bought a pot for cooking za sui – so I'll savour your liver, entrails, and lungs." The term za sui (杂碎) is found in newer Chinese-English dictionaries with both meanings listed: cooked entrails, and chop suey in the Western sense.

See also

 American chop suey
 Chinatowns in the United States
 Cap cai
 Chop Suey! (song)
 Chop suey font
 Japchae
 Subgum

References

Further reading
 E. N. Anderson, The Food of China, Yale University Press, 1988.
 
 
 Andrew Coe, Chop Suey: A Cultural History of Chinese Food in the United States, 2009. .
 Alan Davidson, The Oxford Companion to Food, 1999.
 Monica Eng, "Chop Suey or Hooey?", orig. Chicago Tribune, January 4, 2006, online rpr. Honolulu Advertiser, 
 . Free online, also archived at Wayback Machine

Cookbooks with recipes for chop suey and accounts of Chinese American cuisine

 Hom, Ken. Easy Family Recipes from a Chinese American Childhood. New York: Alfred A. Knopf, 1997.
 Yin-Fei Lo, Eileen. The Chinese Kitchen: Recipes, Techniques and Ingredients, History, and Memories from America’s Leading Authority on Chinese Cooking. New York: William Morrow, 1999.
 Chatterjee, Rhitu. A Classic Chinese-American Dish Takes On A Mexican Flair  NPR. August 3, 2017.

External links
 Chop Suey Origin at snopes.com
 Chop Suey was invented, fact or fiction? August 29, 1896 at americaslibrary.gov

American Chinese cuisine
Cantonese words and phrases
Chinese-American history